Capgemini SE is a multinational information technology (IT) services and consulting company, headquartered in Paris, France.

History
Capgemini was founded by Serge Kampf in 1967 as an enterprise management and data processing company. The company was founded as the Société pour la Gestion de l'Entreprise et le Traitement de l'Information (Sogeti).

In 1974, Sogeti acquired Gemini Computers Systems, an American company based in New York. In 1975, having made two major acquisitions of CAP (Centre d'Analyse et de Programmation) and Gemini Computer Systems, and following resolution of a dispute with the similarly named CAP UK over the international use of the name 'CAP', Sogeti renamed itself as CAP Gemini Sogeti.

Cap Gemini Sogeti launched US operations in 1981, following the acquisition of Milwaukee-based DASD Corporation, specializing in data conversion and employing 500 people in 20 branches throughout the US. Following this acquisition, The U.S. Operation was known as Cap Gemini DASD.

In 1990 Cap Gemini Sogeti acquired the UK company Hoskyns Group, the European leader in IT outsourcing and managed services.

In 1996, the name was simplified to Cap Gemini, and the firm launched a new group logo. All operating companies worldwide were re-branded to operate as Cap Gemini.

Ernst & Young Consulting was acquired by Cap Gemini in 2000. It simultaneously integrated Gemini Consulting to form Cap Gemini Ernst & Young. In 2017, Cap Gemini S.A. became Capgemini SE, and its Euronext ticker name similarly changed from CAP GEMINI to CAPGEMINI.

Its large backend team is based in India. Earlier Capgemini acquisitions included Kanbay for $1.2 billion and iGate for $4 billion.

In 2019, Capgemini acquired Altran, in the largest acquisition in the company's history, bringing the total employee count to over 250,000. As part of the acquisition, Capgemini acquired frog design and Cambridge Consultants, which were integrated into Capgemini Invent; several other recent acquisitions in the design and digital space, including staff from Fahrenheit 212, Idean, and June21, have been merged into this group and operate under the frog brand.

In June 2021, Capgemini partnered with Sanofi, Orange & Generali to launch Future4care, a European start-up accelerator focused on digital healthcare. In 2021, Capgemini acquired RXP Services and Acclimation in Australia to expand their operations in Australia. Also in 2021, Capgemini acquired Australian company Empired and its New Zealand subsidiary Intergen.

As of 2021, Capgemini has over 300,000 employees in approximately 50 countries, with around 120,000 in India.

Services

Capgemini Invent

Capgemini Invent was launched in September 2018, as the design and consulting brand of the Capgemini Group. Located in more than 37 offices globally, Capgemini Invent includes more than 10,000 employees. These include staff from frog design, which was acquired as part of the deal whereby Altran became Capgemini Engineering, and now operates as "frog, part of Capgemini Invent." Employees from Fahrenheit 212, Idean, and June21, have been integrated into the frog organization and Capgemini Invent.

Capgemini Engineering

Capgemini Q-Lab
Capgemini Q-Lab is a quantum computing laboratory set up in 2022 in collaboration with IBM, and will be an authorised IBM Quantum Hub. The facility will be available in the UK, Portugal and India, and will work as research facilities to help build quantum applications. The lab will feature IBM's latest 127-qubit quantum processor, Eagle.

Sogeti

Sogeti is a wholly owned subsidiary of Capgemini Group. It is an information technology consulting company specialising in technology and engineering  professional  services.

Management 
The Capgemini Group Executive Committee consists of 27 members. On 20 May 2020, Aiman Ezzat was appointed as the new CEO. He is associated with Capgemini for more than 20 years. From 2005 to 2007, Aiman was Capgemini's Deputy Director of Strategy. In November 2007, Ezzat was appointed COO of the Financial Services Global Business Unit, and became its Global Head in December 2008 till 2012. From January 2018 to May 2020, he served as Chief Operating Officer and prior to this as Chief Financial Officer, from December 2012 to 2018.

From 2012 to 2020, Paul Hermelin served as the Group Chairman and CEO. He joined Capgemini in 1993, and was appointed as its CEO in 2002. In May 2012, Hermelin became chairman and CEO of the Capgemini Group. He succeeded Serge Kampf, who served as the Vice Chairman of the Board until his death on 15 March 2016.

In May 2020, Aiman Ezzat succeeded Paul Hermelin as CEO. Paul Hermelin continues as Chairman of the Board of Directors.

Capgemini and the public sector in France
In December 2022, the consulting firm McKinsey & Company was alleged, amongst other accusations,  to have benefitted in France from special access and favorable government treatment, including the awarding of lucrative government contracts. The French media dubbed the scandal the "McKinsey Affair". Subsequently, a French Senate Committee of Inquiry investigated the growing influence of private consulting firms on public policy.

In February 2022 Senator Éliane Assassi  questioned each consulting firm on their activities on specific projects. She raised in particular the case of a former employee of the Capgemini group, who had been appointed as head of the Elysée correspondence service. The service subsequently contracted Capgemini to reorganize its digital tools, with the aim of setting up a system to automate mail reading to produce reports. "Is it not embarrassing, from your point of view, that a former employee of Capgemini is responsible for reviewing the correspondence service of the Élysée?", the senator asked. "It is not up to us to have an opinion on who, within the client organization, triggers this type of service", replied Mathieu Dougados, executive director, and he suggested the commission ask the Élysée.

Etienne Grass, director of public sector activities at Capgemini commented "In principle, our employees are not intended to be recruited", and for good reason: "when it happens, it puts us in a complex situation", he admitted. However, the firm makes an exception vis-à-vis the State, by not applying certain contractual clauses which prevent an employee from joining a client, "provided that an ethical framework has been fixed", the director underlined.

In June 2022, Le Monde published a survey of the significant lucrative projects carried out by Capgemini for the French public sector entitled "Consulting firms: Capgemini, the expensive service provider that the State can no longer do without". The name of Etienne Grass, head of the "public sector" market unit of Capgemini Invent since 2017, was mentioned.

References

External links

 

 
Companies listed on Euronext Paris
French companies established in 1967
Consulting firms established in 1967
Technology companies established in 1967
Information technology consulting firms of France
Management consulting firms of France
International information technology consulting firms
International management consulting firms
Companies based in Paris
1967 establishments in France
Multinational companies headquartered in France
CAC 40
Outsourcing